The  is a Japanese thoroughbred horse race  on dirt track only for three years old. It is run over a distance of 1,800 meters (about 9 furlongs) at Oi Racecourse in Shinagawa, Tokyo in April or May. This race is graded as South Kanto (Minami-Kanto) grade 1 (S1) just like the Tokyo Derby.

It began in 1955 as the Oi Hai. Its name was changed to Haneda Hai in commemoration of Haneda racecourse which used to be situated next to Shinagawa.

Its distance has been changed three times. From 1955 to 1966, it was 2000 meters long, from 1967 to 1998, 2400 meters, and after 1999, 2000 meters. Horses belonging to Minami-Kanto Horseracing can run.

This is the first leg of triple crown race of Minami-Kanto horseracing.

Winners since 2001

References

Flat horse races for three-year-olds
Horse races in Japan